Bhairon Singh Shekhawat became Chief Minister of Rajasthan thrice. First time in 1977 when Janata Party won 151 of the 200 seats in the state assembly elections of Rajasthan and Shekhawat took over as the first non Congress Chief Minister of Rajasthan. His government was dismissed by Indira Gandhi in 1980. He was chief minister again for the periods of 1990–1992 and 1993 to 1998. Here is the list of ministers in his first ministry (1977–80)

Cabinet ministers
Bhairon Singh Shekhawat-Chief minister
Prof Kedar Nath
Lalit Kishore Chaturvedi
Sampat Ram
Master Adityendra
Trilok Chandra Jain
Digvijay Singh
Purushottam Mantri
Surya Narain Chaudhary
Bhanwar Lal Sharma
Manak Chand Surana
Kalyan Singh Kalvi
Dr Hari Singh
Jai Narayan Poonia
Birad Mal Singhvi

Ministers of State
Vidya Pathak
Mehboob Ali
Kailash Meghwal
Vigyan Modi
Nand Lal Meena
Lal Chand

See also
Second Shekhawat ministry

References

Shekhawat 01
1977 in Indian politics
Janata Party state ministries
1977 establishments in Rajasthan
1980 disestablishments in India
Cabinets established in 1977
Cabinets disestablished in 1980